The 1936 Victorian Football Association season was the 58th season of the Australian rules football competition. The premiership was won by the Northcote Football Club, after it came from fourth on the ladder to defeat Prahran by 15 points in the Grand Final on 12 September. It was the club's fifth VFA premiership, all won between 1929 and 1936, and it was the last top division VFA premiership ever won by the club before it left the Association in 1987.

Premiership 
The home-and-home season was played over eighteen matches, before the top four clubs contested a finals series under the Page–McIntyre system to determine the premiers for the season.

Ladder

Finals

Awards 
 Lance Collins (Coburg) was the leading goalkicker for the season; he kicked 116 goals in the home-and-home season and did not participate in the finals.
 In the parallel Association best and fairest awards:
 Bert Hyde (Preston) and Peter Reville (Coburg), both in their first season of Association football, jointly won the Recorder Cup, each polling five votes. Neville Huggins (Williamstown), S. Plumridge (Port Melbourne) and Les White (Prahran) were equal third with four votes apiece.
 The Association Medal was won by Neville Huggins (Williamstown), who polled 33 votes; Bert Hyde (Preston) finished second with 32 votes, and Les White (Prahran) was third with 27 votes.
 Brunswick won the seconds premiership. Brunswick 11.11 (77) defeated Coburg 10.12 (72) in the Grand Final on Saturday 12 September at the Brunswick Cricket Ground.

Notable events 
 In the seconds match between Port Melbourne and Northcote on June 13, Port Melbourne vice-captain Robert Rowe suffered a fractured skull in a head clash with a Northcote opponent. He suffered meningitis as a result of the injury, and died eight days later.
 In the final round of home-and-away matches, Preston 10.11 (71) trailed Brunswick 17.19 (121) by 50 points at three-quarter time, before kicking 8.10 (58) to no score with the wind in the final quarter to win the game by eight points, 18.21 (129) d. 17.19 (121). The comeback set a new record for the largest final quarter comeback in VFA history, which stood until 1940. So strong was the wind affecting the match that only two behinds out of the game's total 250 points were kicked to the northern end of Preston City Oval; and, the ball kept being blown so far beyond the southern goal that the extra time required to repeatedly retrieve it saw Preston's comeback finish in semi-darkness.
 A charity game for the benefit of the sportsmen's ward at Prince Henry's Hospital was held on the evening of Thursday 24 September (Show Day holiday) at Olympic Park between combined teams representing the Victorian Football League and the Victorian Football Association. The attendance was 2,000. The League 14.15 (99) defeated the Association 10.10 (70).

External links 
 List of VFA/VFL Premiers

References 

Victorian Football League seasons
VFL